San Fior is a comune (municipality) in the Province of Treviso in the Italian region Veneto, located about  north of Venice and about  northeast of Treviso.

San Fior borders the following municipalities: Codogné, Colle Umberto, Conegliano, Godega di Sant'Urbano, San Vendemiano.

Frazioni

San Fior is divided into three villages: the principal town is San Fior (or San Fior di Sopra); the south frazione is San Fior di Sotto and the north frazione is Castello Roganzuolo.

Demographic evolution

Twin towns
San Fior is twinned with:

  Colayrac-Saint-Cirq, France

References

Cities and towns in Veneto